Medicine Lodge State Archeological Site is a Wyoming state park that interprets the Medicine Lodge Creek Site, a prehistoric Native American archeological site near Hyattville, Wyoming. It is administered by the Wyoming Division of State Parks and Historic Sites. The site is at the base of a steep limestone outcropping near the point where the dry and running portions of Medicine Lodge Creek join. for a protected location with ready access to water. The site includes petroglyphs and pictographs on the rock face. Excavations starting in the 1970s have found twelve levels of habitation in 10.5 feet of stratum, ranging from historic times to 8300 years before the present. The archeological site was designated in 1973. The site is managed as a state park, with campgrounds and a visitor center. It was added to the National Register of Historic Places on July 5, 1973.

References

External links
 Medicine Lodge Archeological Site at Wyoming State Parks
 Medicine Lodge Creek Site at the Wyoming State Historic Preservation Office
 Medicine Lodge Creek Site at WyoHistory.org

National Register of Historic Places in Big Horn County, Wyoming
Archaeological sites on the National Register of Historic Places in Wyoming
State parks of Wyoming
Protected areas of Big Horn County, Wyoming